The 143rd district of the Texas House of Representatives contains parts of Houston, Galena Park, and Jacinto City. The current Representative is Ana Hernandez, who has represented the district since 2005.

References 

143